The California state elections, November 2008 were held on November 4, 2008 throughout California. Among the elections taking place were those for the office of President of the United States, all the seats of California's delegation to the House of Representatives, all of the seats of the State Assembly, and all of the odd-numbered seats of the State Senate. Twelve propositions also appeared on the ballot. Numerous local elections also took place throughout the state.

President

United States House of Representatives 

All 53 seats of the United States House of Representatives in California were up for election. Before and after the election, 34 seats were under Democratic control and 19 were under Republican control.

California State Senate 

The California State Senate is the upper house of California's bicameral State Legislature. There are a total of 40 seats and only the 20 odd-numbered ones were up for election. The Democratic Party maintained a majority of 25, with the remaining 15 seats under the control of the Republican Party. Neither party lost or gained any seats.

California State Assembly 

The California State Assembly is the lower house of California's State Legislature. All 80 seats were up for election every two years. Before the election, the Democrats controlled 48 seats, while the Republicans controlled 32. After the election, the Democrats increased its majority to 51, while the Republican minority shrank to 29. A total of five seats changed parties: four to the Democrats and one to the Republicans.

Propositions

Proposition 1A 

Proposition 1A is a bond measure to fund the California High-Speed Rail line from Los Angeles to San Francisco.

Proposition 2 

Proposition 2 is an initiative statute regarding standards for confining farm animals.

Proposition 3 

Proposition 3 is an initiative statute that authorizes children's hospital bonds and grants.

Proposition 4 

Proposition 4 is an initiative constitutional amendment regarding waiting periods and parental notification before termination of a minor's pregnancy.

Proposition 5 

Proposition 5 is an initiative statute regarding nonviolent offenders, sentencing, parole, and rehabilitation.

Proposition 6 

Proposition 6 is an initiative statute regarding criminal penalties and public safety funding.

Proposition 7 

Proposition 7 is an initiative statute regarding renewable energy.

Proposition 8 

Proposition 8 is an initiative constitutional amendment that would ban same-sex marriage in California.

Proposition 9 

Proposition 9 is an initiative constitutional amendment and statute that deals with the criminal justice system, victims' rights, and parole.

Proposition 10 

Proposition 10 is an initiative statute that authorizes bonds for alternative fuel vehicles and renewable energy.

Proposition 11 

Proposition 11 is an initiative constitutional amendment and statute that deals with redistricting.

Proposition 12 

Proposition 12 is a bond measure that would assist veterans with buying property.

See also 
February 2008 California elections
June 2008 California elections

References 

California 11